Carlo Barcellesi (born 20 May 1961), best known as Maurizio Milani, is an Italian stand-up comedian, actor and writer.

Biography 

Born in Milan in 1961, he obtained a degree in agriculture from the "Istituto Tecnico Agrario Statale Tosi" of Codogno, the city where his family is from.

He began as a comedian at Zelig Cabaret in Milan in 1987. The character of his personage is a man of the street, cynical, engaged in thousands of jobs, often dishonest. His monologues are characterized by irony. From 2003 to 2008 he participated as a regular guest to the transmission of Rai 3, Che tempo che fa, conducted by Fabio Fazio.

Very active as author of satirical books, he writes for the newspapers Il Foglio and Libero, and collaborates with the monthly Max.

Career highlights

Theater 
 1992, Un uomo da badile
 1993, Piacenza
 1995, Animale da fosso
 1995, Il Circo di Paolo Rossi
 1998, Il pubblico all'uscita si lamenta

Television 

 1993, Letti Gemelli
 1992, Su la testa! (Rai 3)
 1993, Cielito lindo (Rai 3)
 1997–98, Scatafascio (Italia 1)
 1998–99
 Comici (Italia 1)
 Facciamo cabaret (Italia 1)
 2003–08, Che tempo che fa (Rai 3)

Bibliography 

 1994, Animale da fosso, Bompiani
 1996, Un uomo da badile, Baldini & Castoldi
 1998, Vantarsi, bere liquori, illudere la donna, Baldini&Castoldi
 2003, La donna quando non capisce s'innamora, Kowalski
 2005, In amore la donna vuol tribolare, Kowalski
 2006, L'uomo che pesava i cani, Kowalski
 2007, Del perché l'economia africana non è mai decollata, Kowalski
 2010, Mi sono iscritto nel registro degli indagati, Rizzoli
 2011, Chi ha ciulato la Corrente del Golfo?, Aliberti
 2012, Fidanzarsi non conviene, Barbera
 2013, Uomini che piangono per niente, Rizzoli
 2014, Saltar per terra causa vino, Wingsbert House
 2016, Il verro ruffiano, Baldini & Castoldi

References

External links

 

1961 births
Living people
Male actors from Milan
Italian male television actors
Italian comedians
Italian humorists
Italian satirists
Italian male comedians
Italian male stage actors
20th-century Italian male actors
21st-century Italian male actors
20th-century Italian non-fiction writers
20th-century Italian male writers
21st-century Italian writers
21st-century Italian male writers
People from Codogno
Italian male non-fiction writers